The 2005–06 Premier Academy League Under–18 season was the ninth edition since the establishment of The Premier Academy League, and the 2nd under the current make-up. The first match of the season was played in August 2005, and the season ended in May 2006.

Southampton U18 were the champions.

References

See also
Premier Reserve League
FA Youth Cup
Football League Youth Alliance
Premier League
The Football League

Premier Academy League
Academy
Academy

ja:プレミアアカデミーリーグ